Damien Borel (born June 1, 1993) is an American football defensive lineman who is currently a free agent. He attended (and played football at) Woodland High School and Butte College. In 2012, while at Butte, he tallied 69 tackles and 19 sacks. Borel's 19 sacks led all California Community College Athletic Association players in 2012.

Borel was assigned to the San Jose SaberCats of the Arena Football League on May 15, 2015. As a rookie, Borel recorded seven tackles and two sacks in limited playing time. He won his first AFL Championship when the SaberCats defeated the Jacksonville Sharks in ArenaBowl XXVIII at the end of the season.

On December 9, 2015, Borel was assigned to the Arizona Rattlers. On April 26, 2018, he was assigned to the Baltimore Brigade.

References

External links
 San Jose SaberCats bio

1993 births
Living people
Players of American football from Pasadena, California
American football defensive linemen
Butte Roadrunners football players
San Jose SaberCats players
Sportspeople from Greater Sacramento
Butte College alumni
Arizona Rattlers players
Baltimore Brigade players
People from Woodland, California